Dennis Roland, Jr. (born March 10, 1983) is a former American football offensive tackle. He was signed by the Dallas Cowboys as an undrafted free agent in 2006. Roland has also played for the Tampa Bay Buccaneers, Cincinnati Bengals and Chicago Bears. He played college football at Georgia.

Professional career

Personal life
Roland's father, Dennis Sr., served as the head football coach at Olivet Nazarene University from 1986 to 1990.

References

External links
Chicago Bears bio 
Cincinnati Bengals bio 

1983 births
Living people
People from Polk County, Missouri
American football offensive tackles
Georgia Bulldogs football players
Dallas Cowboys players
Tampa Bay Buccaneers players
Cincinnati Bengals players
Chicago Bears players